Father Brown is  a fictional character created by English novelist G. K. Chesterton.

Father Brown may also refer to:

Father Brown (film), 1954 British film
Father Brown (1966 TV series), a West German TV series that aired on ARD
Father Brown (1974 TV series), 1974 British TV series that aired on ITV
Father Brown (2013 TV series), 2013 British TV series that airs on the BBC
Father Brown, Detective, 1934 American film

Similar spelling
 Father Browne  (1880–1960) Jesuit priest and photographer